Time in Vermont, as in all US states, is regulated by the United States Department of Transportation. Vermont is in the Eastern Time Zone (ET) and observes daylight saving time (DST).

Independent of daylight saving time, solar noon in Vermont on the March equinox is approximately 11:53 in the northeast corner of the state and 12:00 in the southwest corner. New England, which includes Vermont, is one of the few areas in the United States where solar noon is before noon.

IANA time zone database
The IANA time zone database identifier for Vermont is America/New_York.

See also
Time in New England states: Connecticut, Maine, Massachusetts, New Hampshire, Rhode Island, Vermont

References

Vermont
Geography of Vermont